Itä-Häme is the eastern part of the historical province Tavastia in Finland. It is in Päijänne Tavastia, Southern Savonia and Central Finland.

Leivonmäki National Park is in Itä-Häme.

Itä-Häme is also known by manufacturing of sahti.

Municipalities 
 Hartola
 Heinola (town)
 Joutsa
 Luhanka
 Pertunmaa
 Sysmä

Disestablished 
 Heinolan maalaiskunta (merged into Heinola in 1997)
 Leivonmäki (merged into Joutsa in 2008)

Dialects 
Despite being a part of Tavastia, only the dialect of Heinola is a Tavastian dialect. The dialects of the other municipalities are Savonian dialects of the Päijänne subgroup, a group of Savonian dialects with Tavastian influence; for example, they lack the type of consonant gemination found in most other Savonian dialects (e.g. the partitive form of kala "fish" is kalaa/kaloa, not kallaa/kalloa/kalloo).

Most of the area adopted a Savonian dialect due to the Cudgel War, in which many of the original Tavastian inhabitants of the area were killed, allowing Savonians to settle in the area. Despite this, the people of the area still see themselves as Tavastians.

References

Geography of Finland
Regions of Finland